Alexander Mikhaylov may refer to:
Aleksandr Aleksandrovich Mikhailov (1888–1983), Russian astronomer
Alexander Dmitrievich Mikhailov (1855–1884), Russian revolutionary
Alexander Ivanovich Mikhailov (1905–1988), Russian information scientist
Aleksandr Mikhaylov (footballer) (born 2000), Russian football player
Aleksandr Mikhaylov (skier) (born 1970), Russian freestyle skier
Alexander Nikolayevich Mikhailov (1951–2020), governor of Kursk Oblast, Russia
Aleksandr Yakovlevich Mikhailov (born 1944), Russian actor
Aleksandr Mikhaylov (actor, born 1922) (1922–1992), in films such as Alyosha Ptitsyn Grows Up
Aleksandr Aleksandrovich Mikhaylov (born 1926) (1926–1998), Russian actor
Alexander Mikhaylov (rally driver), in events such as the 2016 European Rally Championship

See also
 Mikhaylov (disambiguation)